Good Answer is an EP by The Spinto Band, released in 2004.

Track listing
"Kind of a Girl" – 3:07
"Atari" – 3:48
"Trust vs. Mistrust" – 2:51
"My Special Car" – 3:30
"Did I Tell You?" – 3:09
"Tractor" – 4:37
"Late" – 4:23
"The Puff Daddy Blowjob Movement" – 4:29

References

2004 EPs
The Spinto Band albums